No. 1 is the second studio album by South Korean singer BoA, released on April 12, 2002, by SM Entertainment. The album's composition and arrangement was handled by several music collaborators, such as Yoo Young-jin, Kangta, Ahn Ik-soo, Sigurd Heimdal Rosnes, among others. The title track "No. 1" was released in conjunction with the album and received promotions on domestic music programs.

The album was a commercial success in South Korea, topping the monthly charts for two consecutive months in April and May 2002. It was the year's fourth best-selling album in the country with sales of over 540,000 copies.

Background and release 
There are only limited copies of the first pressing of the album which sold out just in weeks. The first press includes "No. 1 (Original Version)", "My Sweetie (Original Version)", and "Listen to my Heart (Big Chorus Version)". Later pressings of the album contain "No. 1 (Music Video Version)" and "My Sweetie (Corrected Version)" (featuring a slightly amended ending). The Japanese issue of No. 1 was released on June 1, 2002, and includes an exclusive bonus track "No. 1 (English Version)".

Commercial performance 
No. 1 experienced greater success in comparison to her debut album ID; Peace B (2000). No. 1 debuted at number one on the monthly MIAK album chart with initial monthly sales of 232,626 in April 2002 and remained at number one the following month. The album was ranked at number four on the list of the best-selling albums in Korea for 2002, with reported sales of 544,853 that year.

Track listing

Charts

Weekly charts

Monthly charts

Year-end charts

Release history

See also
 List of best-selling albums in South Korea

References

BoA albums
2002 albums
SM Entertainment albums
Korean-language albums